The Mid-Carboniferous unconformity is an unconformity located in many countries, such as England (Namurian Series), Thailand, The United States and more. It has been dated to the Namurian, Middle Carboniferous (c.326-313 Ma) and the formation is often noted as being similar to the mid-Carboniferous eustatic event.

References 

Unconformities
Carboniferous events
Bashkirian
Serpukhovian